Alejandro Gabriel Espinosa Borja, known simply as Gabriel Espinosa (born August 13, 1985 in Quito), is an Ecuadorian footballer.

Honors
LDU Quito
Serie A: 2007, 2010
Recopa Sudamericana: 2010

Universidad Católica
Serie B: 2012

References

External links
Espinosa's FEF player card

1985 births
Living people
Footballers from Quito
Association football midfielders
Ecuadorian footballers
L.D.U. Quito footballers
C.D. Universidad Católica del Ecuador footballers
C.S.D. Independiente del Valle footballers
C.D. Clan Juvenil footballers